

Arthropods

insects

Vertebrates

Expeditions, field work, and fossil discoveries
 Joseph Burr Tyrrell discovered a partial Albertosaurus skull near Kneehills Creek in Alberta Canada. This specimen is now catalogued as CMN 5600.

Pseudosuchians

Non-avian dinosaurs

Synapsids

Plesiosaurs

References